The Second Battle of Mogadishu was a battle fought for control of Somalia's capital city, Mogadishu. The opposing forces were the Alliance for the Restoration of Peace and Counter-Terrorism (ARPCT), and militia loyal to the Islamic Courts Union (ICU). The conflict began in mid-February 2006, when Somali warlords formed the ARPCT to challenge the ICU's emerging influence. The ICU's influence was largely generated by wealthy financial donors who sought to enable the Islamic Courts Union to seize power in the country to bring stability. The battle is referred to as the Second Battle to distinguish it amongst the nine major Battles of Mogadishu during the decades-long Somali Civil War.

It was found after the battle that the United States was supporting the ARPCT due to concerns that the ICU had ties to al-Qaeda. The ICU militia won control of Mogadishu and ARPCT forces left the city.

Background 
In 2005, it was reported that multiple independent Islamic courts had started to work cooperatively under the umbrella of Shariah Law, which would then become the Islamic Courts Union. This movement then seize power of Mogadishu, creating an Islamic movement throughout Somalia. This cooperation among Islamic courts caused Somalian warlords and businessmen to band together and form the ARPCT, with the support of American and Ethiopian aid. After this unification, the members began to mobilize in order to prevent an Islamic movement from taking full power over the capital city. The ARPCT began by conducting various attacks and kidnappings in early 2006, but as the year went on these aggressions caused a conflict to arise.

Battle 
In May 2006, the fighting intensified between warlords and militia loyal to ICU, which controlled around 80% of the city. There had been previous conflict throughout Somalia involving the ARPCT, but nothing that lasted more than a few days, so the outbreak and continuity of this battle signified that it was, in fact, a change from the previous state. On 4 June 2006, the ICU seized Balad, 30 miles north of Mogadishu. Balad had previously been under the control of forces loyal to Musa Sudi Yalahow. By the end of the conflict, it was reported that around 350 people had been killed, with thousands displaced.

On 5 June 2006, Somali Prime Minister Ali Mohamed Gedi fired four ministers (who were also clan leaders) whose private armies were involved in the fighting. Gedi fired National Security Minister Mohamed Afrah Qanyare, Commerce Minister Musa Sudi Yalahow, Militia Rehabilitation Minister Botan Ise Alin and Religious Affairs Minister Omar Muhamoud Finnish, according to government spokesman Abdirahman Nur Mohamed Dinari. He also invited the Islamic courts for talks.

On 5 June 2006, Sheikh Sharif Ahmed, the ICU's chairman, reportedly seized Mogadishu, saying in a radio broadcast: "We won the fight against the enemy of Islam. Mogadishu is under control of its people." The ICU's success has been attributed to the Islamic movement's ability to transcend clan politics.

Following Mogadishu's fall, there were two competing rallies. Mogadishu's largest clan, the Abgaal, held a rally in the city's northern part, reportedly drawing about 3000. AP reports the demonstrators shouting "We don't need Islamic deception!" and "We don't want Islamic courts, we want peace!" There was a competing rally in support of the ICU. At that rally, Sheikh Sharif Ahmed is quoted as saying "Until we get the Islamic state, we will continue with the Islamic struggle in Somalia," to a crowd of about 500.

With the decisive loss to the Islamic courts union, the TFG removed 4 prominent ARPCT members from their positions within the TFG.

The ARPCT's remaining forces are said to have fled to Jowhar. A member of the ARPCT coalition said that the coalition has "no immediate plans," following their decisive loss.

On 14 June 2006, following a stand-off that lasted for approximately eight days, the ICU reportedly attacked the remaining ARPCT forces in Jowhar, routing them and seizing the town. Ali Mohamed Gedi has since then requested peacekeeping forces from the African Union, and neighboring states such as Kenya have imposed sanctions on the fleeing warlords, barring them entry into their lands.

Legacy 
Ali Mohamed Gedi has since requested peacekeeping forces from the African Union, and neighboring states such as Kenya have imposed sanctions on the fleeing warlords, barring them entry into their lands.

In December 2006, Ethiopia declared war on the victor of the battle, the ICU. In addition to the long-standing tensions between Ethiopia and Somalia over land claim, the Ethiopian government did not look favorably on the ICU being in power in Somalia. This conflict was short lived, falling in favor of Ethiopia.

United States support for ARPCT
Michael Zorick (the U.S. State Department's political officer for Somalia), who had been stationed in Nairobi, was reassigned to Chad after he sent a cable to Washington criticizing Washington's policy of paying Somali warlords. The Times stated, "The American activities in Somalia have been approved by top officials in Washington and were reaffirmed during a National Security Council meeting about Somalia in March."

On 7 June 2006, the Republic of the Congo's president and current African Union head, Denis Sassou-Nguesso, criticized the United States for its involvement in fighting in Mogadishu following his meeting with President George W. Bush and Secretary of State Condoleezza Rice.

See also
Somali Civil War
Battle of Mogadishu (1993)
Fall of Mogadishu (2006)
Battle of Mogadishu (March–April 2007)
Battle of Mogadishu (November 2007)
Battle of Mogadishu (2008)
Battle of South Mogadishu (2009)
Battle of Mogadishu (2009)
Battle of Mogadishu (2010–11)

References

External links
  Death toll climbs as Mogadishu fighting intensifies, AFP, 9 May 2006
  Despite ceasefire call, fighting continues in Mogadishu, The Christian Science Monitor, 10 May 2006
 From Clan Fighting to Ideological Battleground, UN Integrated Regional Information Networks, 11 May 2006
 Illegal Arms Continue to Fuel Factional Fighting, UN Integrated Regional Information Networks, 12 May 2006
  Bloody street battles in Somalia, CNN, 13 May 2006
  Warring Somali ministers warned, BBC News, 13 May 2006
 Islamic Courts Accept Ceasefire, Shabelle News Network, 15 May 2006
 Somali PM Plans to Fire Two of His Cabinet, Shabelle News Network, 15 May 2006
 Security Council Calls for Ceasefire And End to Violence in Capital, UN News Service, 16 May 2006
 U.S. Secretly Backing Warlords in Somalia, The Washington Post, 17 May 2006
 Renewed Fighting Claims 11 in Mogadishu, UN Integrated Regional Information Networks, 25 May 2006
  Islamic Force, Warlords Clash in Somalia, Associated Press, 27 May 2006
 Violence Flares in Somalia (VIDEO), ogrish.com, updated 28 May 2006
   Large Rally Against United States Staged in Mogadishu, Shabelle Media Network, 2 June 2006
 Islamists claim control of Mogadishu, Al Jazeera News, 5 June 2006
 Somali Islamists win city battle, BBC News, 11 July, USS Ashland LSD-48 22 MEU A1/8 E2/10 Battle of Mogadishu(1993)S.R.Menzel.(USMC)

2006 in Somalia
Mogadishu 2006
21st century in Mogadishu
Conflicts in 2006
Mogadishu 2006
May 2006 events in Africa
June 2006 events in Africa
July 2006 events in Africa